The Army Strategic Forces Command (ASFC) is a major command of the Pakistan Army, which administers land-based nuclear weapons. Its comparable command includes the Pakistan Air Force's Air Force Strategic Command and the Navy's Naval Strategic Forces Command, all commands formed the unified command and control mechanism under the directorship and leadership of the Strategic Plans Division (SPD)

Significantly, it is a newer component of administrative corps of Pakistan Army. It is tasked to command all of Pakistan's land-based strategic forces.

History 
Before its establishment, the Pakistan Air Force's Air Force Strategic Command was completely responsible for protecting the nuclear assets and had control over the land and air-based nuclear weapons. The Air Force Strategic Command was active during the country's nuclear test experiments in 1998, and it had completely dismantle the role of the Army to take any decisions over the nuclear weapons. Its success influenced Chief of Army Staff and Chairman of the Joint Chiefs of Staff Committee General Pervez Musharraf to established a new formation that was created in June 1999. General Pervez Musharraf desired to have a formal command and control structure for the employment of Pakistan land based nuclear weapons, completely independent from the Air Force.

The Command was established after Prime Minister Nawaz Sharif ordered nuclear tests in 1998, under codename Chagai-I and Chagai-II in Balochistan Province.  The command structure includes the Nuclear Command Authority, Strategic Plans Division, and the Strategic Forces Commands of Air Force, and the Pakistan Navy. The formation itself became operational in March 2000. It became a fully fledged corps in 2004.

Employment 
The official remit of the formation is "the command and employment of all land-based strategic assets." This description seems to imply that it controls most, if not all, of Pakistans ballistic launchers. While Pakistan is a nuclear weapons state, it is unknown at this time if ASFC is in possession or control of any nuclear warheads, though presumably in a nuclear war, a good percentage of the warheads would be delivered to their targets by the launchers of the ASFC.

Composition 
Since 2004, ASFC has been made the equivalent of a corps. It has subordinate divisions, brigades and units. There is scant information on these, except for the 21 Artillery Division (Pano Aqil) and 22 Artillery Division (Sargodha), which seems to be missile artillery divisions. Previously 47 Artillery Brigade was reported at Sargodha.

List Of Commanders ASFC

References 

Strategic forces of Pakistan
Commands of Pakistan Army
Military units and formations established in 2000
2000 establishments in Pakistan